Peacekeeper may refer to:

General
 A person involved in peacekeeping
 United Nations peacekeeping
 Peace officer
 Conservator of the peace

Military 
 The LGM-118 Peacekeeper, a land-based nuclear ICBM
 Peacekeeper Rail Garrison, a mobile missile system for the LGM-118 Peacekeeper
 Cadillac Gage Ranger, armored fighting vehicles
 Cadillac Gage Peacekeeper II, one of the two models of the vehicle

Fiction 
 The Peacekeepers, a 1988 Star Trek: The Next Generation novel by Gene DeWeese
 The Peacekeeper, a 1997 Canadian and American action film
 Peacekeepers (Farscape), a fictional military and law enforcement organization in Farscape
 Peacekeepers (The Hunger Games), the combined military and police force in Panem in The Hunger Games
 "Peacekeeper" (NCIS), a 2021 television episode
 Peacekeepers, a 1988 science fiction novel by Ben Bova

Video games 
 The Peace Keepers, a 1993 video game for the Super Nintendo Entertainment System
 Peacekeeper Revolver, a video game gun for the Phillips Cd-i video game console

Other uses 
 Peacekeeper (benchmark), a web browser benchmark from Futuremark Corporation
 Peacekeeper (EP), by Barkmarket, 1995
 "Peacekeeper" (song), by Fleetwood Mac, 2003
 Peacekeeper Park, an urban park in Calgary, Alberta, Canada
 Peacekeepers Way, a highway in Nova Scotia, Canada
 Newfoundland and Labrador Route 2, also known as Peacekeepers Way, a highway in Newfoundland, Canada

See also
 Peacemaker (disambiguation)